The FIS Nordic Junior World Ski Championships 2002 took place in Schonach im Schwarzwald, Germany from 20 January to 27 January 2002. It was the 25th Junior World Championships in Nordic skiing.

Schedule
All times are in Central European Time (CET).

Cross-country

Nordic combined

Ski jumping

Medal summary

Junior events

Cross-country skiing

Nordic Combined

Ski jumping

Medal table

References 

2002
2002 in cross-country skiing
2002 in ski jumping
Junior World Ski Championships
2002 in youth sport
International sports competitions hosted by Sweden